Thyreosthenius is a genus of sheet weavers that was first described by Eugène Louis Simon in 1884.

Species
 it contains only two species.
Thyreosthenius biovatus (O. Pickard-Cambridge, 1875) – Europe, Russia (Europe to Far North East)
Thyreosthenius parasiticus (Westring, 1851) – North America, Europe, Caucasus, Russia (Europe to Far East)

See also
 List of Linyphiidae species (Q–Z)

References

Araneomorphae genera
Holarctic spiders
Linyphiidae
Palearctic spiders